Cristián Daniel Gutiérrez Zúñiga (born February 18, 1997) is a professional soccer player who plays as a left-back for Major League Soccer club Toronto FC. Born in Canada, he previously represented Chile at the U20 level, but filed his FIFA one-time switch in 2021 to switch allegiances to Canada.

Early life
Gutiérrez was born in Greenfield Park, Quebec in Canada and move to Santiago, Chile with his family when he was four. He began playing soccer at age five with the youth system of Colo-Colo. In 2013, he won the U17 title with Colo-Colo.

Club career
He began his senior career with Colo-Colo B in 2013 in the Segunda División Profesional de Chile.

Gutiérrez made his professional debut with Colo-Colo in a 3–1 Copa Chile home win over Deportes Concepción on March 1, 2015. In November 2015, he signed a professional contract with the club through 2019. After being a consistent first team player, he was part of the 2015 Torneo Apertura winning team.

After being demoted back to the Colo-Colo youth teams, in February 2017, he went on loan to fellow Chilean side Unión Española. In August 2017, Gutiérrez was loaned to Huachipato. In March 2019, his loan was terminated early for him to return to Colo-Colo. He departed the club upon the expiry of his contract in December 2019, after not having his contract renewed.

In January 2020, he joined Major League Soccer club Vancouver Whitecaps FC on a two-year contract with an additional two option years. He made his debut during the MLS is Back Tournament on July 19 against Seattle Sounders FC. He became a regular fixture for the club in his first couple of seasons, despite initially arriving as a back up. Between the final matches of the 2020 season and the beginning of the 2021 season, he set the club MLS record for longest assist streak by a defender. With the club, he won the 2022 Canadian Championship.

In March 2023, he was claimed off waivers by Toronto FC.

International career
Gutiérrez was eligible to represent both Canada and Chile.

In 2015, he was named to the Chile U20 team for the L'Alcúdia Tournament, helping them win the title. He then subsequently represented the squad at the 2017 South American U-20 Championship.

After previously rejecting calls from the Canadian national team, as he had been waiting for additional opportunities with Chile, in 2020, Gutiérrez filed his FIFA one-time switch to switch his representation from Chile to Canada. He was called up to the Canadian national team for the first time, for a training camp in January 2021. In March 2021, he was called up ahead of matches in the 2022 FIFA World Cup qualification cycle. After initially being unselected for the 2021 Gold Cup, he was later named as an injury replacement for Alphonso Davies, but would not travel to the Gold Cup and would remain with the MLS club, unless needed by Canada.However, despite regularly being called up for World Cup qualifying, he did not make his debut featuring on the bench six times, and was not ultimately selected to the 2022 FIFA World Cup squad.

Personal life
His twin brother Diego is also a professional soccer player.

References

External links
 
 

1997 births
Living people
Sportspeople from Longueuil
Citizens of Chile through descent
Chilean footballers
Chile under-20 international footballers
Canadian soccer players
Canadian people of Chilean descent
Sportspeople of Chilean descent
Colo-Colo B footballers
Colo-Colo footballers
Unión Española footballers
C.D. Huachipato footballers
Segunda División Profesional de Chile players
Chilean Primera División players
Vancouver Whitecaps FC players
Whitecaps FC 2 players
Major League Soccer players
MLS Next Pro players
Chilean expatriate sportspeople in the United States 
Expatriate soccer players in the United States
Association football fullbacks
Naturalized citizens of Chile
Canadian twins
Chilean twins
Twin sportspeople
Toronto FC players